The Brochet MB.60 Barbastelle was a French two-seater work plane built by Maurice Brochet in the late 1940s.

Design and development
The MB.60 was a high-wing monoplane with a closed cabin. Although a two seater like the Brochet MB.50, it was distinguished by an airfoil without sweep-back, a raised upper deck of the rear fuselage and a fixed landing gear with split axle. Power came from a 83 horsepower Salmson 5-cylinder radial engine.

The only MB.60 to be completed (registered F-BFKT) took to the air on 24 June 1949 in Chavenay, piloted by André Deschamps. In the following July it was subjected to glider towing tests and presented in August at the 2nd National RSA rally before passing the certification tests. With Brochet working on the Brochet MB.70, the sole MB.60 was sold to a flying club and used as a glider tug. By the end of 1951 it had totaled 2,000 cycles.

Specifications

References

Further reading

External links
 

Brochet aircraft
Aircraft first flown in 1949